Aglaeactis is a genus of hummingbirds in the family Trochilidae.

It contains the following species:

Territories 

Shining sunbeam territories are characterized by highly utilized central core areas with high overall use, but low foraging activity. These territories are usually those associated with structural complexity like canopy coverings, vegetation densities, and ideal nesting/roosting sites. High canopy heights and adequate vegetation densities allow these hummingbirds to effectively transmit auditory and visual signals. More exposed and elevated perches are usually favored. These birds pick the most ideal territories to avoid predators and defend their territories.

References

 
Bird genera
 
Taxonomy articles created by Polbot